Krania is a village and a community of the Elassona municipality. Before the 2011 local government reform it was part of the municipality of Antichasia, of which it was a municipal district and the seat. The 2011 census recorded 2,691 inhabitants in the village. The community of Krania covers an area of 94.258 km2.

Aromanian is spoken in this village. The Aromanian dialect of Krania is one of the few with differential object marking (DOM) together with those dialects spoken at the west of Ohrid in North Macedonia.

Population
According to the 2011 census, the population of the settlement of Krania was 2,691 people, almost the same with the population of the previous census of 2001.

See also
 List of settlements in the Larissa regional unit

References

Populated places in Larissa (regional unit)